Terese Hosking (Pedersen) (born 27 April 1980 in Sandefjord) is a Norwegian handball goalkeeper. She recently played for Byåsen HE, but is now retired.

She started her club career in Larvik, and has also played for Runar, Sandar, Tertnes, and Randers HK.

She made her debut on the Norwegian national team in 2004, and played 82 matches with the team. She is a three-time European champion, in 2004, 2006 and 2008. She received a silver medal at the 2007 World Women's Handball Championship, and was ranked first on the championship's list of Top Goalkeepers with respect to % saves.

References

External links

1980 births
Living people
People from Sandefjord
Norwegian female handball players
Norwegian expatriate sportspeople in Denmark
Expatriate handball players
Sportspeople from Vestfold og Telemark
21st-century Norwegian women